Magnesium phosphate is a general term for salts of magnesium  and phosphate appearing in several forms and several hydrates:
 Monomagnesium phosphate (Mg(H2PO4)2).xH2O
 Dimagnesium phosphate (MgHPO4).xH2O
 Trimagnesium phosphate (Mg3(PO4)2).xH2O

Amorphous magnesium phosphate is also claimed.

Safety 
Magnesium phosphates are listed on the U.S. FDA's Generally recognized as safe (GRAS) list of substances.

See also 
 Ammonium magnesium phosphate

References

External links 
 
 

Magnesium compounds
Phosphates
E-number additives